A Dangerous Meeting is a compilation album of King Diamond and Mercyful Fate songs. The vinyl version included "Satan's Fall", which was omitted from the CD version due to time constrictions.

Track listing

Credits
King Diamond – vocals (all tracks)
Hank Shermann – lead guitar (tracks 1-7)
Andy LaRocque – lead guitar (tracks 8-16)
Michael Denner – lead guitar (tracks 1-13)
Pete Blakk – lead guitar (tracks 14-16)
Timi Hansen – bass guitar (tracks 1-13)
Hal Patino – bass guitar (tracks 14-16)
Kim Ruzz – drums (tracks 1-7)
Mikkey Dee – drums (tracks 8-15)
Snowy Shaw – drums (Track 16)

References

1992 greatest hits albums
Mercyful Fate albums
King Diamond compilation albums
Roadrunner Records compilation albums